Sinthusa makikoae is a butterfly of the family Lycaenidae. Its forewing length is 12–13 mm. The species is very rare; it is endemic to Borneo and found only in Sabah.

References

, 1985: Two New Species of Lycaenid Butterflies from North Borneo (Lepidoptera: Lycaenidae).: IWASE. 3: 3-5, 15. 
, 1991: Butterflies of Borneo, Lycaenidae. 2(1): 1-113. Toboshima Corporation. Tokyo.

Butterflies described in 1983
Sinthusa
Butterflies of Borneo